The Guiyang Metro is a rapid transit system in the city of Guiyang, Guizhou province, China. It is operated and branded as Guiyang Urban Rail Transit (GYURT).

A short northern section of Line 1 opened on 28 December 2017, with the full line entering operation on 1 December 2018. Line 2 opened on 28 April 2021. Line 3, Line S1 and Line T2 are also under construction.

Fares
Fares are set by distance traveled, with RMB 6 being the maximum. Children under 1.3 meters ride free, with other children being half-price, though paper children's tickets need to be bought from the counters as they are not yet available from the ticket machines as of February 2019. Those over 70 years old travel free on public transport in Guiyang.

Lines in operation

Line 1

Line 1 was approved for construction on 6 May 2013, and approved for plan in 2006. The line goes through Guanshanhu, Yunyan, Nanming and Huaxi Districts. The line twice crosses Nanming River and connects the downtown area with a number of outlying districts. The line depots are Xiaohe Depot and Guanshanhu Depot. The railway electrification system are overhead line and third rail. Line 1 runs northwest to south.

Line 2

Line 2 is 40.6 km with 32 stations, including 30 underground stations and 2 elevated stations. Line 2 runs north to southeast. It opened on April 28, 2021.

Lines under construction

Line 3
The first phase of Line 3 is under construction. It will be 43.03 km in length. It is expected to open in 2023.

Line S1
The first phase of Line S1 is under construction. It will be 30.32 km in length, including 
22.64 km underground section and 7.68 km elevated section. It is expected to open in 2024.

Line T2
The first phase of Line T2 is under construction. It will be 10.92 km in length, with 13 stations. It is expected to open in 2024.

Future Development
Long-term plan
Lines 4, S2, S3, S4, and Line G1 which passes through the Gui'an New Area, are in the planning stage.

See also
 List of metro systems

Notes

References

External links
 Guiyang Urban Rail Transit – official website

 
Rapid transit in China
Transport in Guizhou